Gamal Hamza (born 5 December 1981) is an Egyptian former footballer. He played for Zamalek SC for most of his football career. He last played for the Egyptian Premier League side Haras El-Hodood.

Career

Zamalek
Hamza is a Zamalek youth academy graduate, and is considered one of the best Egyptian forwards. He is one of the highest scoring players in Cairo Derby against Al Ahly with eight goals. He is known for once having sported a reverse-Mohawk haircut, which he has since abandoned.

On 14 May 2009, Hamza signed a pre-contract with the Switzerland club FC Luzern. However, no agreement between Luzern and Hamza's club Al Zamalek came about.

Mainz
On 24 June 2009, Hamza signed with the German side 1. FSV Mainz 05 on a 2+1 basis, and was on 11 October 2009 released from his contract.

El Gouna FC
Having destroyed any hope of a possible comeback to former club Zamalek by choosing their bitter rivals Ahly over them, Hamza returned to former club El Gouna and made a good impression by scoring three goals in the league's first four matches. After a dispute with the technical staff, Hamza was completely excluded from all of the club's matches for the remainder of the first half of the season and a decision was reached to sell him in the winter transfer window.

International career
Hamza played in the World Youth Cup U20 Argentina in 2001 and holds 18 games, scoring four goals for the A-team. He played for the Egyptian football team

Honours

Club
Zamalek

Egyptian Premier League (3): 2000–01, 2002–03, 2003–04

Egyptian Super Cup (2): 2000–01, 2001–02

Egypt Cup (2): 2000–01, 2007–08

African Cup Winners' Cup: 2000

CAF Champions League: 2002

CAF Super Cup: 2003

Saudi-Egyptian Super Cup: 2003

Arab Unified Club Championship,Prince Faisal bin Fahd Tournament for Arab Clubs:|2003]]

International
Egypt

World Youth Cup Bronze Medal: 2001

References

External links
 
 

1981 births
Living people
Egyptian footballers
Egypt international footballers
Egyptian expatriate footballers
Footballers from Cairo
Zamalek SC players
1. FSV Mainz 05 players
Misr Lel Makkasa SC players
Haras El Hodoud SC players
Association football forwards
Expatriate footballers in Germany
2002 African Cup of Nations players
Egyptian Premier League players
Egyptian expatriate sportspeople in Georgia (country)
Expatriate footballers in Georgia (country)
FC Zugdidi players
Egyptian expatriate sportspeople in Germany
El Gouna FC players